Lithophasia quadrivirgula is a moth of the family Noctuidae first described by Paul Mabille in 1888. It is found from Morocco to Egypt, Israel, Jordan and Iraq.

Adults are on wing from November to February. There is probably one generation per year.

External links

Cuculliinae
Moths of the Middle East
Moths described in 1888